Karen Thompson may refer to:

 Karen Thompson (model), model and actress associated with Playboy
 Karen Thompson (born 1968), American voice actor professionally known as Megan Hollingshead
 Karen Thompson, gay rights campaigner in In re Guardianship of Kowalski
 Karen Thompson (Home and Away), a fictional character from Australian soap opera Home and Away

See also
Karen Thompson Walker, writer